Andrés Orozco-Estrada (born 14 December 1977) is a Colombian violinist and conductor, with dual nationality in Colombia and Austria.

Early life
Born in Medellín, Orozco-Estrada studied music at the Instituto Musical Diego Echavarría and learned to play violin there before taking conducting classes from age 15. Before his seventeenth birthday, he moved to Bogotá to study at the Pontifical Xavierian University.
He immigrated to Vienna, Austria, in 1997, where he has lived ever since and where, that same year, he began advanced conducting studies at the University of Music and Performing Arts, where his teachers included Uroš Lajovic.

Career
In June 2004, he first conducted the Tonkünstler Orchestra at a Vienna Festwochen concert, as a last-minute substitute. This led to his appointment as assistant conductor of the orchestra, a post he held for two years. Orozco-Estrada became principal conductor of the Tonkünstler Orchestra in 2009, a post he held until 2015. Earlier he served as principal conductor of the ensemble “recreation” Großes Orchester Graz and, from 2005 to 2007, as music director of Oper Klosterneuburg.

Outside Austria, in May 2007, Orozco-Estrada first guest-conducted the Orquesta Sinfónica de Euskadi in San Sebastián, Spain (his father was of Basque descent). The next year he was named the orchestra's principal conductor, a post he took up in 2009 and held until June 2013.

Orozco-Estrada guest-conducted the Frankfurt Radio Symphony in 2009. In March 2013, he was named the next principal conductor of the hr-Sinfonieorchester, effective with the 2014–2015 season, with an initial contract of 4 years.  In April 2016, the orchestra announced the extension of his contract through the 2020–2021 season.  He concluded his tenure with the hr-Sinfonieorchester at the close of the 2020–2021 season.

Orozco-Estrada first guest-conducted the London Philharmonic Orchestra (LPO) in November 2013, on a tour with the orchestra in Germany.  In January 2014, the LPO announced the appointment of Orozco-Estrada as its next principal guest conductor, effective September 2015.

Orozco-Estrada first guest-conducted the Vienna Symphony Orchestra in 2006.  In March 2018, the Vienna Symphony announced his appointment as its next chief conductor, effective with the 2021–2022 season, with an initial contract of 5 years. He held the title of chief conductor designate in the 2020–2021 season. Orozco-Estrada resigned as chief conductor of the Vienna Symphony on 12 April 2022, with immediate effect. The orchestra said the reason was its decision not to extend his contract beyond 2025.

Orozco-Estrada debuted with the Houston Symphony Orchestra in October 2012, an appearance that led to a second engagement with the orchestra, for a private rehearsal.  In January 2013, the Houston Symphony appointed Orozco-Estrada as its next music director, as of the 2014–2015 season.  Before taking up the Houston post, he and the orchestra recorded Dvořák's Seventh Symphony. His most recent contract extension with the Houston Symphony was until the 2021–2022 season.  Orozco-Estrada is scheduled to conclude his Houston music directorship at the close of the 2021–2022 season.

Orozco-Estrada also serves as principal conductor of the Filarmónica Joven de Colombia and led them on their 2019 European tour.

Recordings
Orozco-Estrada has recorded commercially with the Houston Symphony and the Frankfurt Radio Symphony for Pentatone.

 Richard Strauss – Eine Alpensinfonie. Frankfurt Radio Symphony. PTC 5186628 (2018).
 Haydn – Die Schöpfung. Houston Symphony, Houston Symphony Chorus. PTC 5186614 (2018).
 Music of the Americas: Bernstein, Gershwin, Piazzolla, Revueltas. Houston Symphony. PTC 5186619 (2018).
 Richard Strauss – Salome. Frankfurt Radio Symphony. PTC 5186602 (2017).
 Dvořák – Symphony No. 9 ("New World") / Slavonic Dances. Houston Symphony. PTC 5186574 (2017).
 Richard Strauss – Ein Heldenleben / Macbeth. Frankfurt Radio Symphony. PTC 5186582 (2016).
 Dvořák – Symphony No. 7 & 8. Houston Symphony. PTC 5186578 (2016).
 Dvořák – Symphony No. 6 & 2, Slavonic Dances. Houston Symphony. PTC 5186575 (2016).
 Stravinsky – The Rite of Spring & The Firebird (Suite 1919). Frankfurt Radio Symphony. PTC 5186556 (2016).

Personal life
Orozco-Estrada and his wife Julia, an Austrian veterinarian, live in Vienna with their daughter Laura.

References

External links
 IMG Artists Agency page on Orozco-Estrada
 Orquesta Sinfónica de Euskadi English-language biography
 Brian Wilson, Review of Pentatone PTC5186575.  MusicWeb International website, June 2016

1977 births
Living people
People from Medellín
University of Music and Performing Arts Vienna alumni
Colombian conductors (music)
21st-century conductors (music)